The Willard D. Straight House was the New York City residence of Willard Dickerman Straight. The mansion is at 1130 Fifth Avenue on the northeast corner with East 94th Street. It is located in the Carnegie Hill neighborhood on the section of Fifth Avenue known as Museum Mile and is one of only three houses remaining on Fifth Avenue in single-family occupancy, 925 and 973 Fifth Avenue, near 74th and 79th Street, respectively.

History

The house was designed by the firm of Delano & Aldrich in the neo-Georgian style and was completed in 1915. The ground floor of the house is organized around a circular hallway in the 18th-century style topped by a dome, with a patterned black and white marble floor. The Straight family also owned a complementary building at 162 East 92nd Street, also designed by Delano & Aldrich, that was used as a garage. The second and third floors of this building contained apartments for staff. Straight died during the influenza epidemic of 1918 and his widow Dorothy Whitney Straight continued to live in the house for several years with her children. She remarried and moved to England but continued to own the house until 1927.

The house was sold to Judge Elbert H. Gary, Chairman of the Board of Directors of the United States Steel Corporation (who had recently sold his home at 956 Fifth Avenue which was demolished to make way for a new apartment building), who died in the house the same year. The next owner was Harrison Williams, a utilities investor, and his wife Mona.

In 1952, the house was sold to the Audubon Society for use as their headquarters, which they called the Audubon House. The Society left in 1971 and, in 1974, the building was sold to the International Center of Photography for use as a new museum devoted exclusively to photography with photo‐journalist Cornell Capa as executive director. In 2000, as ICP was consolidating at their Midtown Manhattan location they sold the building for $17.5 million to hedge fund founder Bruce Kovner for use as a personal residence. The noise and debris associated with Kovner's years long conversion of the Federal-style building back to an "opulent private residence" reportedly caused his neighbors dismay and was written about in The New York Times in 2003.

See also
List of New York City Designated Landmarks in Manhattan from 59th to 110th Streets
National Register of Historic Places listings in Manhattan from 59th to 110th Streets

References

Further reading

External links 

The Straight Residence at Beyond the Gilded Age

1915 establishments in New York (state)
Delano & Aldrich buildings
Fifth Avenue
Houses completed in 1915
Houses in Manhattan
New York City Designated Landmarks in Manhattan
Upper East Side
Gilded Age mansions